Zaachila Zapotec (San Raymundo Jalpan Zapotec) is a small Zapotec language of Oaxaca, Mexico. It is perhaps a dialect of Yatzeche Zapotec, which is 85% intelligible to Zaachila speakers. Tilquiapan Zapotec is 75% intelligible, 72% of San Juan Guelavía to Zaachila speakers.

Zaachila Zapotec is spoken in San Raymundo Jalpan, south Oaxaca City, past Xoxo, Zaachila,  San Bartolo Coyotepec, San Pablo Cuatro Venados, and Santa María Coyotepec. It is not written.

References

External links 
OLAC resources in and about Zapotec, Zaachila

Zapotec languages